Flat Top, with an elevation of 4,142 feet, is the 20th-highest peak in Georgia, United States. It is located in Rabun County, Georgia and is within the boundaries of the Chattahoochee National Forest. There is a view of the rock face of Flat Top from the Bartram Trail.

See also
List of mountains in Georgia (U.S. state)

References 
Georgia's Named Summits
100 highest peaks in Georgia

External links 
Topographical map of Flat Top

Mountains of Georgia (U.S. state)
Mountains of Rabun County, Georgia
Chattahoochee-Oconee National Forest